Louise Brough and Margaret duPont defeated the defending champions Doris Hart and Pat Todd in the final, 6–3, 3–6, 6–3 to win the ladies' doubles tennis title at the 1948 Wimbledon Championships.

Seeds

  Louise Brough /  Margaret duPont (champions)
  Doris Hart /  Pat Todd (final)
  Molly Blair /  Jean Bostock (semifinals)
  Betty Hilton /  Kay Menzies (third round)

Draw

Finals

Top half

Section 1

Section 2

Bottom half

Section 3

Section 4

References

External links

Women's Doubles
Wimbledon Championship by year – Women's doubles
Wimbledon Championships
Wimbledon Championships